United Nations Security Council Resolution 150, adopted unanimously on August 23, 1960, after examining the application of the Republic of the Ivory Coast for membership in the United Nations the Council recommended to the General Assembly that the Republic of the Ivory Coast be admitted.

See also
List of United Nations Security Council Resolutions 101 to 200 (1953–1965)

References
Text of the Resolution at undocs.org

External links
 

 0150
 0150
 0150
1960 in Ivory Coast
August 1960 events